SDSC may refer to:

 San Diego Supercomputer Center
 Satish Dhawan Space Centre
 Strategic and Defence Studies Centre
 Secure Digital Standard Capacity card
 São Carlos Airport (ICAO-Code)